False Kisses is a 1921 American silent drama film directed by Paul Scardon and starring Miss DuPont, Pat O'Malley and Lloyd Whitlock.

Cast
 Miss DuPont as Jennie
 Pat O'Malley as Paul
 Lloyd Whitlock as Jim
 Camilla Clark as Pauline
 Percy Challenger as John Peters
 Madge Hunt as Mrs. Simpson
 Fay Winthrop as Mrs. Glimp
 Joseph Hazelton as Mr. Glimp
 Mary Philbin as Mary

References

Bibliography
 Munden, Kenneth White. The American Film Institute Catalog of Motion Pictures Produced in the United States, Part 1. University of California Press, 1997.

External links

1921 films
1921 drama films
American black-and-white films
Silent American drama films
American silent feature films
1920s English-language films
Films directed by Paul Scardon
Universal Pictures films
1920s American films